Sun Shengnan (born 21 January 1987) is a Chinese former tennis player. Her highest WTA singles ranking is 216th, which she reached on 4 April 2011. Her career-high in doubles is 50th, which she reached on 17 September 2007.

By March 2006, Sun had won two ITF singles titles and risen to No. 320 in the WTA rankings, and had earned herself a reputation as 'one to watch', having shown plenty of recent promise of further improvement in the preceding year.

Career
Sun Shengnan began competing on the ITF Circuit at the age of 15, in May 2002. Over the next few months, she won seven matches (mostly in qualifying draws) and lost just five. However, she did not compete again for a whole year after the beginning of August, and thus gained for herself only a lowly end-of-year foothold on the world ranking list at No. 1031.

When August finally came around again in 2003, she returned to competition as a 16-year-old at ITF events; and that October she reached the quarterfinal of a $25k tournament at Beijing after being awarded a wildcard entry into the main draw, before losing to Yuka Yoshida. She finished the year with a 5–5 win–loss record after just a few events played. The record of her year-end ranking seems to have been lost by the WTA, but it was undoubtedly an improvement on her 2002 outcome thanks to the quarterfinal finish at Beijing.

2004 was another moderate year for Sun, as she won six matches and lost seven, her best finish again coming at October's $25k tournament at Beijing, where she repeated her previous year's performance in reaching the quarterfinal, this time losing to high-ranked countrywoman Zheng Jie. She finished the year world-ranked 588, which logically should have been similar to her previous year's finish.

But it was to be in 2005 that the Chinese teenager would first break through to greater results, including two tournament wins. In February, she reached her career-first semifinal in the $10k tournament at Melilla. In April, she won the $10k event at Wuhan. Then in May, she won another $10k title at Ahmedabad. In August, she reached the final of a $25k fixture at Wuxi, losing to Miho Saeki of Japan. Then in September, she qualified for her first WTA Tour event at Guangzhou International Open with an impressive three-set victory over the young Croat prospect Ivana Lisjak, but lost in the first round of the main draw to Alina Jidkova of Russia. At the end of the year, her world ranking had leapt up to 336.

In January 2006, she suffered a few early losses, but picked up enough points in qualifying rounds to improve to a career-best ranking of 311 early in February. Then she defended but did not improve upon her previous year's semifinal performance at Melilla.

With youth still very much on her side, the 19-year-old appeared to be one of China's hottest next-generation prospects for advancement into the world's top 150. But after rising to a career high of No. 233 in May 2007, a dismal run of early losses over the summer and Autumn that year caused her ranking to slip back to No. 400 by the beginning of December the same year before a quarterfinal result at a $75k tournament that month revived it to around 350 at the close of the year.

She then started the year off in 2011, making the semifinals in the $50k event at Quanzhou moving her rankings up to world No. 248.

WTA career finals

Doubles: 3 (1 title, 2 runner-ups)

ITF Circuit finals

Singles: 8 (6–2)

Doubles: 43 (26–17)

See also
 Tennis in China

References

External links
 
 

1987 births
Living people
Chinese female tennis players
Tennis players from Beijing
Grand Slam (tennis) champions in girls' doubles
Tennis players at the 2010 Asian Games
Asian Games competitors for China
Australian Open (tennis) junior champions
21st-century Chinese women